Śledź is a Polish surname. Notable people with the surname include:

Roman Śledź (born 1948), Polish sculptor
Dariusz Śledź (born 1969), Polish motorcycle speedway rider

Polish-language surnames